The Associates Triangular Series in South Africa was a One Day International cricket tournament involving the national teams of Canada, Netherlands and Bermuda, held in South Africa.

Points Table

Matches

See also
Other triangular series featuring ICC associate members:

 Associates Triangular Series in Kenya in 2006–07
 Associates Triangular Series in West Indies in 2006–07
 Dubai Triangular Series 2014–15

One Day International cricket competitions
International cricket competitions in 2006–07